{{Infobox person
| name               = D.J. McPherson
| image              = DJ McPherson.jpg
| occupation         = WriterDirectorProducerShowrunner
| years_active       = 2013–present
| known_for          = 'The Infernal Machine (2022)Seriously Red (2022)
"His Name is Jeremiah (2020)
}}

D.J. McPherson is a two-time Emmy Award winning and nominated film and television writer, producer, director and showrunner. She splits her time between Melbourne and LA and has worked with actors such as Guy Pearse, Rose Byrne and Sarah Snook.

Her recent productions include the feature films Seriously Red, The Infernal Machine, Run Rabbit Run, Nandor Fodor and the Talking Mongoose, What Remains of Us, as well as the televisions series Troppo.While she was touring the world as a musical theatre performer she would write about her experiences. Her performing career was also cut short due to a knee injury so after years of writing she decided to actively pursue it as a career option.

Get Ace was her breakthrough which was broadcast on Network 10 and Hulu. It was nominated for an International Emmy Award in 2015.

She says: "I storylined all 52 episodes of the first series and wrote a bunch episodes too. But writing 52 episodes was a job way too big for one person, so we put together a writers room of six super talented writers. It was inspiring to work with such a hardworking and experienced team in such a collaborative way."

In 2019, after ten years as a professional screenwriter she landed a streaming deal for His Name is Jeremiah, her first feature film. She spoke to i.f.com.au and said that the story is set in South Australia's Coober Pedy and is about a teenager who was brought up in foster care while her mothers spent ten years in jail and developed an obsession with a missing boy, Jeremiah which sets off a chain of events. She wrote the story while she was recovering from heart surgery in Virginia. The film featured at the Austin After Dark Film Festival in 2019.

After her debut, His Name is Jeremiah was produced by McPherson, she won the Grand Prize in Animal Logic's Truant Pictures Screenplay Competition. The prize was $5,000AUD. Truant Pictures Executive Greg Schmidt said: "D.J.'s writing caught our eye immediately with characters that grabbed us from page one and a story that consistently delivered solid drama, chills and suspense. It's everything we look for in emerging talent."

Film producer Jack Christian is set to produce the mystery thriller feature alongside McPherson and Ozark creator Mark Williams.

 Filmography 
 Chief of Station (2023) – executive producer
 What Remains of Us (2023) – executive producer
 Nandor Fodor and the Talking Mongoose (2023) – executive producer
 Run Rabbit Run (2023) – executive producer
 The Infernal Machine (2022) – executive producer
 Mercy Road (2022) – executive producer
 Troppo (2022-) – executive producer
 Love in Bloom (2022) – executive producer
 Seriously Red (2022) – executive producer
 His Name is Jeremiah (2020) – writer / producer
 Sit. Stay. Love. (2020) – executive producer
 Never Too Late (2020) – executive producer
 Get Ace (2014–2017) – creator / writer / showrunner / producer / director
 Heart&Soul'' (2013–2015) – executive producer

References

External links 
 

American film producers
American screenwriters
Showrunners
Living people
Year of birth missing (living people)